Sever the Wicked Hand is the ninth studio album by American sludge metal band Crowbar. It was released on February 8, 2011 via E1 Music, on February 14, 2011 via Century Media in the UK, and a day later for the rest of Europe. It was the band's first studio album after Lifesblood for the Downtrodden, released exactly six years before in 2005.

Background
Sever the Wicked Hand was the first album that frontman Kirk Windstein recorded sober.

Critical reception

According to Metacritic, the album received "generally favorable" reviews and a score of 79.  Writing for Popmatters, Adrien Begrand praised Crowbar for ensuring that its ninth album "sound so fresh while sounding so comfortably familiar at the same time", and gave particular accolades to Kirk Windstein's vocals on "Let Me Mourn", the emotional intensity of "Echo an Eternity", and the soulful closing track, "Symbiosis". Situating the album in the context of Windstein's recent recovery from alcoholism, Eduardo Rivadavia wrote for AllMusic that, while there are "no great revelations or revolutions" on Sever the Wicked Hand, Windstein's "spirit and inspiration have clearly been revitalized, and the end results amount to a quintessential Crowbar album" among the strongest of the band's career.

Track listing

Personnel
Kirk Windstein – vocals, rhythm guitar
Matt Brunson – lead guitar
Pat Bruders – bass
Tommy Buckley – drums

Guest musicians
Patrick Plata – vocals on "A Farewell to Misery"
Duane Simoneaux – piano on "A Farewell to Misery"

Production
Kirk Windstein – production
Zeuss – mixing and mastering
Duane Simoneaux – engineering
Thomas De Ville – engineering
Mike D'Antonio – art

References

Crowbar (American band) albums
2011 albums
E1 Music albums